Hampstead Cricket Club is a cricket club in London. The team was formed in 1865, and have played their home games at Lymington Road in West Hampstead since 1877. The men's 1st XI play in the Middlesex Premier League which they have won twice, most recently in 2015.The men's 2nd XI have also won twice, most recently in 2022 and the men's 3rd XI have won 4 times.

Past players

In 1886, future England captain Andrew Stoddart scored a then record 485 in one day for Hampstead against  Stoics. A statue of Stoddart commemorating this event was unveiled by former England captain Andrew Strauss as part of the club's 150th anniversary celebrations in 2015.

Leading nineteenth-century Australia bowler Fred Spofforth played for the club between 1891 and 1905, taking 951 wickets.

Japanese international cricketer Shizuka Miyaji played for the Women's 1st XI in the 2019 season. She scored 146 runs in a league match against Ashford Cricket Club, setting a new club record for the highest individual score by a woman for Hampstead Cricket Club.

Honours
 1969 – DH Robins Cup
 2013 – ECB Middlesex Premier League Champions
 2015 – ECB Middlesex Premier League Champions
2018 – Women's Cricket Southern League (Collins Division) Champions

Teams 
As of the start of the 2022 season, Hampstead field six senior men's teams in Saturday league cricket, and two senior women's teams in Sunday league cricket. The men's 1st, 2nd and 3rd XIs all play in the top division of their respective Middlesex League competitions.They also field a U21s MDL (Middlesex Development League) team.

The club also field numerous age-group teams for both boys and girls.

First XI league records 
Hampstead joined the Middlesex County Cricket League in 1980 and since then the following records have been set:

Highest Team Score : 369–2 dec v Uxbridge at Lymington Road in 2003
Lowest Team Score : 38 v Finchley in 1981
Highest Individual Score : 206* – Paul Weekes v Uxbridge at Lymington Road in 2003
Most Runs in a Season : 961 – Mark Harvey in 2003
Best Bowling : 9/28 – Andrew Lamb v Teddington at Lymington Road in 2006
Most Wickets in a Season : 51 – Paul Weekes in 2008

References

External links 
 Middlesex County Cricket League
 Hampstead Cricket Club

English club cricket teams
Cricket in Middlesex
Cricket clubs established in 1865
1865 establishments in England